The Serbian Water polo Cup (Serbian: Куп Србије у ватерполу, Kup Srbije u vaterpolu) is the national water polo cup of Serbia. It is run by the Water polo Federation of Serbia.

Winners
 2006–07 to present: Serbian Water polo Cup

*The 2006–07 season in Water polo Cup of Serbia were played without playoff phase.

Performance by club

See also
Serbian Water polo League A

External links
 Water Polo Federation of Serbia 

2